The Krazy Kat Klub—also known as The Kat and Throck's Studio—was a Bohemian cafe, speakeasy, and nightclub in Washington, D.C. during the historical era known as the Jazz Age. Founded in 1919 by portraitist and scenic designer Cleon "Throck" Throckmorton, the back-alley establishment functioned as a speakeasy after the passage of the Sheppard Bone-Dry Act in March 1917 by the United States Congress that imposed a ban on alcoholic beverages in the District of Columbia. Within a year of its founding, the club became notorious for its riotous live performances of hot jazz music which often degenerated into mayhem.

The club's name derived from the androgynous title character of a comic strip that was popular at the time, and this namesake communicated that the venue catered to clientele of all sexual persuasions, including polysexual and homosexual patrons. Due to this inclusive policy, the secluded venue became a rendezvous spot for Washington, D.C.'s gay community who could meet without fear of exposure. By 1922, the Kat's libertine denizens were known for their unapologetic embrace of free love ("unrestricted impulse"), and municipal authorities publicly identified the venue as a den of vice.

Over time, the club became one of the most vogue locations for Washington's cultural elites to mingle. Contemporary sources alleged that, during the second term of President Woodrow Wilson's administration, the club's habitués included federal government employees as well as possibly members of the U.S. Congress. After existing for over half-a-decade and surviving numerous police raids, the club presumably closed at an indeterminate date prior to 1928 when Throckmorton relocated to Hoboken, New Jersey. Today, the club's neighborhood is the site of The Green Lantern, a D.C. gay bar.

Location 

Situated at No. 3 Green Court near Washington, D.C.'s Thomas Circle, the Krazy Kat Klub was in an economically-depressed urban area colloquially known as the Latin Quarter. Its inconspicuous entrance was in a narrow alley that led out to Massachusetts Avenue. During 1921, the entrance door bore a rectangular hand-painted sign that read "Syne of Ye Krazy Kat"  and featured a black cat that resembled Krazy Kat being hit by a brick. A chalk-inscribed message adorned the top of the door that warned: "All soap abandon ye who enter here". The club's open hours were advertised as "9 p.m. to 12:30".

The club's unphotographed indoor dining area was situated on a second-floor of an old livestock stable. Upon entering via the alleyway, patrons crossed "a lumber-littered room" and ascended a "narrow winding staircase" to reach "a smoke-filled, dimly lighted room that was fairly well filled with laughing, noisy people, who seemed to be having just the best time in the world, with no one to see and no one to care who saw". Rife with cobwebs, the indoor dining area had "futurist pictures on the walls, small wooden tables, rickety chairs, and candles for light". The club's premises included both an indoor dance floor and an outdoor courtyard for al fresco dining and art exhibitions. The courtyard featured a small rustic tree-house, accessible via a wooden twelve-step ladder.

History 

On March 3, 1917, the controversial passage of the Sheppard Bone-Dry Act directly led to the closure of 267 barrooms and nearly 90 wholesale establishments in the District of Columbia. Over 2,000 employees in D.C. barrooms and wholesale establishments were thrown out of work, and the district lost nearly half-a-million dollars per year in tax revenues. In the wake of this draconian bill, underground speakeasies such as the Krazy Kat Klub and others soon flourished. 

Circa 1919, artist Cleon Throckmorton founded the Krazy Kat Klub after he had completed his engineering studies at George Washington University. By day, Throckmorton was an associate of the drama department at Howard University, a historically black college. By night, he ran the raucous speakeasy in the Latin Quarter. He shared ownership of the venue with co-proprietors John Don Allen and John Stiffen. A pre-Raphaelite impressionist, Throckmorton believed that artists should pursue their vocation day and night by surrounding themselves with appropriate settings that inspired creativity, and the venue fulfilled that purpose.

Due to its courtyard and tree-house, the establishment became as an idyllic haunt for artists, bohemians, flappers, and other free-wheeling "young moderns" during the Jazz Age. A frequent club habitué was Throckmorton's first wife Katherine "Kat" Mullen, a model and sketch artist known for her radio performances as a singer and ukulele player with the Crandall Saturday Nighters.

By 1920, the speakeasy was already renowned for its riotous live performances of hot jazz music which occasionally degenerated into violence and mayhem. A crime reporter for The Washington Post described the Krazy Kat Klub as being "something like a Greenwich Village coffee house", featuring gaudy pictures painted by futurists and impressionists. According to the Washington City Paper, The Kat clandestinely functioned as an underground nexus for Washington, D.C.'s gay community. Jeb Alexander, a gay Washington, D.C. resident, described the transgressive venue in his secret personal diary as a "bohemian joint in an old stable up near Thomas Circle... [a gathering place for] artists, musicians, atheists [and] professors". Writer Victor Flambeau described the club in a February 1922 article for The Washington Times:

Over time, the Krazy Kat Klub became one of the most vogue locations for Washington's intelligentsia and aesthetes to congregate. According to Throckmorton, the avant-garde venue "proved not only a club for artists, but a source of supply for musicians and playwrights", and he claimed that several plays were written on its premises. Flambeau noted that, by 1922, "in imitation of the Krazy Kat, other bohemian restaurants sprang up in Washington to supply the demand" such as the Silver Sea Horse and Carcassonne in Georgetown.

During its tumultuous half-decade existence, municipal authorities repeatedly declared The Kat to be a "disorderly house" (a euphemism for a brothel), and the metropolitan police raided the establishment on several occasions during the Prohibition period. One particular raid in February 1919 interrupted a violent brawl inside the club, during which a gunshot was fired. The surprise raid resulted in the arrests of 25 krazy kats—22 men and 3 women—described in a Washington Post report of February 22nd as "self-styled artists, poets and actors". The article specifically noted that several arrested patrons "worked for the [federal] government by day and masqueraded as Bohemians by night". 

The club presumably closed at some time prior to 1928 when Throckmorton relocated to Hoboken, New Jersey. During this same period, Throckmorton divorced his first wife and model Katherine Mullen. He subsequently married screen actress Juliet Brenon, the niece of Irish-American motion picture auteur Herbert Brenon who directed the first cinematic adaptation of The Great Gatsby (1926). Throckmorton later would become one of the most prolific scenic designers for Broadway plays, and his Greenwich Village apartment that he shared with Juliet Brenon would become an after-hours salon for thespians, artists, and intellectuals such as Noël Coward, Norman Bel Geddes, Eugene O'Neill and E.E. Cummings. Their politically leftward salon later would raise funds for the Republican faction during the Spanish Civil War.

Gallery

See also 
 Cleon Throckmorton

References

Citations

Works cited

Print sources

Online sources

External links 

 "Flambeau Finds Washington's Bohemia In Hidden Haunt", The Washington Times, February 5, 1922.
 "Scenes from the Past... Fun During Prohibition at Thomas Circle's Krazy Kat Club & Speakeasy", The InTowner, June 14, 2009 (Archived).
 "The 1920s Speakeasy Club with a Treehouse in the Backyard", MessyNessy, July 4, 2012.

Restaurants established in 1919
Restaurants disestablished in the 20th century
Krazy Kat
Speakeasies
1920s in Washington, D.C.
Nightclubs in Washington, D.C.
Music venues in Washington, D.C.
LGBT nightclubs in Washington, D.C.
Defunct jazz clubs in the United States
1919 establishments in Washington, D.C.
1926 disestablishments in Washington, D.C.
Bohemianism
Flappers